The following is a list of notable performers of rock and roll music or rock music, and others directly associated with the music as producers, songwriters or in other closely related roles, who died in 2016. The list gives their date, cause and location of death, and their age.

List

See also
List of murdered musicians

References 

2016 rock and roll
2010s in music
2010s-related lists
21st-century musicians
Rock and roll 2016
2016